Fasciculus mirre is a Germanic devotional book that was popular in the Low Countries during the first half of the sixteenth century. The text contains meditations on the life of Jesus Christ, most notably the Passion. Its Latin title (meaning "a bundle of myrrh" in English) comes from the first chapter of Canticum Canticorum: "Fasciculus Myrrhae dilectus meus mihi inter ubera mea commorabituris." Fasciculus mirre is often sometimes spelled as Fasciculus myrre, or myrrhæ, and can also be referred to by an English title, On the Life of Christ. The earliest known printed version dates to approximately 1500 CE in the Dutch city of Delft.

Background

Fasciculus mirre was first compiled by an anonymous Franciscan in the German city of Cologne, although the exact date of its original composition is unknown. During a time when Europe was on the eve of the Protestant Reformation, the pocket-sized text was convenient for those who could carry it around with them everywhere, reading it throughout the day and embracing the spiritual power it was believed to have embodied.

Following the expansion of both the printing press and the Reformation during the first half of the sixteenth century, various editions of the book were widely circulated throughout the Low Countries while the region was under the control of Charles V and the Holy Roman Empire. Between 1518 and 1550, twenty separate editions of Fasciculus mirre were printed in the bustling, mercantile hub of Antwerp, a city which was becoming an epicenter of commercial printing as well as a popular safe-haven for non-Catholic religious movements such as Calvinism and Lutheranism.

Dutch Printed Editions, 1500-1578

1500: Delft - Roelant Bollaert
1504: Antwerp - Willem Vorsterman
1517: Delft - Hugo Jansz (or Janszoon) van Woerden, edited by Matthias Weynsen (or Weijnsen) (or Matthijs Wentsen)
1518: Antwerp - Henrick van Eckert Homberch, edited by Matthias Weynsen
1519: Antwerp - Willem Vorsterman, edited by Matthias Weynsen
1519: The Hague - Hugo Jansz van Woerden
1520: Antwerp - Heyndrick Peetersen van Middelburch, edited by Matthias Weynsen
1526: Antwerp - Symon Cock voor (for) Roelant Bollaert, edited by Matthias Weynsen
1527: Antwerp - Jan I van Ghelen
1527: Antwerp - Willem Vorsterman
1529: Antwerp - Symon Cock, edited by Matthias Weynsen
1534: Antwerp - Willem Vorsterman
1535: Antwerp - Willem Vorsterman
1537: Antwerp - Hansken van Liesvelt
1537: Antwerp - Heyndrick Peetersen van Middelburch
1538: Antwerp - Heyndrick Peetersen van Middelburch
1539: Antwerp - Symon Cock
1540: Antwerp - Jan I van Ghelen
1540: Antwerp - Heyndrick Peetersen van Middelburch
1543: Antwerp - Willem Vorsterman, edited by Matthias Weynsen
1543: Antwerp - Jacob van Liesvelt
1544: Antwerp - Heyndrick Peetersen van Middelburch, edited by Matthias Weynsen
1546: Leiden - Peter Janszoon, edited by Matthias Weynsen
1548: Antwerp - Jacob van Liesvelt, edited by Matthias Weynsen
1550: Antwerp - Heyndrick Peetersen van Middelburch, edited by Matthias Weynsen
1550: Unknown Location - Unknown Printer (woodcuts by Bollaert?)
1554: Leiden - Peter Janszoon, edited by Matthias Weynsen
1565: Antwerp - Peeter van Keerberghen, edited by Matthias Weynsen
1565: Leiden - Dierick Gerridt Horst voor Peeter van Keerberghen, edited by Matthias Weynsen
1569: Antwerp - Jan II van Ghelen
1572-78: Antwerp - Symon Cock voor Roelant Bollaert

English Jesuit Version

In 1632-33, the book was translated into English by the Jesuit priest John Falconer. Falconer published it as Fasciculus myrrhæ. Or a briefe treatise of our Lord and Sauiours passion. Written by the R. Fa. I. F. of the Society of Iesus.

Modern Significance

Today, Fasciculus mirre continues to be a curious obscurity in the vast realm of devotional literature and incunabula. Fully intact copies are extremely rare, but can be found through the Universal Short Title Catalogue database. Typically, only leaves (single pages with text on each side) can be found within the United States, either in museums or in University Libraries of Special Collections, as such leaves are prized among collectors of rare medieval manuscripts, incunabula, and post-incunabula.

Examples of Leaves Housed at University Libraries in the United States

 Indiana University of Pennsylvania Indiana, Pennsylvania
 University of South Carolina Columbia, South Carolina
 University of Missouri Columbia, Missouri
 Western Michigan University Kalamazoo, Michigan
 Portland State University, Portland, Oregon

See also
 Book of hours
 Block books
 Incunable
 Global spread of the printing press
 List of printers in the Southern Netherlands
 The Protestant Reformation
 Habsburg Netherlands
 Guild of Saint Luke

Notes

Further reading

Roest, Bert. "Franscicans Between Observance and Reformation: The Low Countries (ca. 1400-1600)." Franciscan Studies 63 (2005): 409-42.
Stock, Jan Van Der. Printing Images in Antwerp: The Introduction of Printmaking in a City: Fifteenth Century to 1585. Studies in Prints and Printmaking; v. 2. Rotterdam: Sound & Vision Interactive, 1998.
Vervliet, Hendrik D. L. Sixteenth Century Printing Types of the Low Countries. Amsterdam: Menno Hertzberger, 1968.
Wijsman, Henri Willem, Kelders, Ann, and Sutch, Susie Speakman. Books in Transition at the Time of Philip the Fair: Manuscripts and Printed Books in the Late Fifteenth and Early Sixteenth Century Low Countries. Burgundica; 15. Turnhout, Belgium: Brepols, 2010.

External links
 The Universal Short Title Catalogue, hosted by the University of Saint Andrews, is "a collective database of all books published in Europe between the invention of printing and the end of the sixteenth century," which includes a list of 29 different editions of Fasciculus mirre that were printed in various Dutch cities between 1504 and 1578.
 Preservation Measures: Pages from the Past. Miami University (Oxford, Ohio), detailed information on The Foliophiles, Inc. and the practice of biblioclasty (book-breaking).

Christian manuscripts